Hema TV is a Bosnian local commercial television channel based in Sarajevo, Bosnia and Herzegovina. The program is mainly produced in Bosnian language, 24 hours via cable networks.

References

External links 
 

Mass media in Sarajevo
Television stations in Bosnia and Herzegovina
Television channels and stations established in 2008